Comfortably Numb is a 1995 American independent  drama film co-written and directed by Gavin O'Connor.

Plot

Cast
 Dana Ashbrook as William Best
 Angela Shelton as Meadow Adare
 Harry Lennix as Hamlin Day
 Tovah Feldshuh as Victoria Stevens
 Mary Beth Peil as Emily Best

References

External links
 

1995 films
1995 drama films
American independent films
Films directed by Gavin O'Connor
American drama films
1995 directorial debut films
1995 independent films
1990s English-language films
1990s American films